Stefano Rota (born 1 October 1961), known professionally as Michael Righeira, is an Italian singer, songwriter, musician and actor. He is best known for his work in the musical duo Righeira.

Early life 

Michael Righeira was born Stefano Rota on 1 October 1961 in Turin.

Rota attended Albert Einstein Scientific High School in Turin, where he first met schoolmate Stefano Righi.

Career 

At the age of 22 in 1983, Rota formed a musical duo together with Righi. They adopted the name Righeira, which was made up by Righi during a football game a few years earlier. The two billed themselves as Michael and Johnson Righeira, as well as "musical brothers". Their music resulted in attention from the La Bionda brothers, who became key figures in their subsequent success. They signed a recording contract in 1982. The duo had their first hit, "Vamos a la playa", in 1983. The success established their reputation as a modern dance duo.

After Righeira disbanded for the second time in 2016, Rota moved to Thiene to pursure other career paths.

Following the first break-up of Righeira in 1992, Rota took an eight-year break from his music career to study law and literature at the University of Padua.

Acting career 

In 1984, Rota starred in the television show Sotto le stelle, where he made his acting debut. The following year, he and comedian Enrico Beruschi co-starred in a sketch for the variety show Drive In. Rota appeared on the La TV delle ragazze show in 1988 together with actress Maria Amelia Monti. Between February 2011 and June 2013, Rota studied at Michael E. Rodgers acting school in Milan.

Personal life

Relationships

Loredana Cazzola 

In 1990, Rota married Loredana Cazzola, a businesswoman from Schio. The couple first met in 1988.

Johnson Righeira 

Though Rota had a close relationship with Righi, the two grew apart following their second break-up in 2016.

Filmography

Television

Notes

References

Sources

External links 

 
 

1961 births
Living people
20th-century Italian composers
20th-century Italian male singers
21st-century Italian composers
21st-century Italian male singers
Italian electronic musicians
Italian male singer-songwriters
Italian multi-instrumentalists
Italian pop singers
Musicians from Turin
Singers from Turin
Righeira